Baptist Sports Medicine is a specialized extension of the Baptist Hospital orthopedic program. Baptist Hospital is a part of Saint Thomas Health Services, which also includes Saint Thomas Hospital in Nashville, Middle Tennessee Medical Center in Murfreesboro and Hickman Community Hospital in Centerville.

Services 
Baptist Sports Medicine combines several services under its umbrella, including general orthopedics, physical therapy, aquatic therapy, athletic medicine and occupational therapy.

In 2007, Baptist Sports Medicine managing director Trent Nessler headed a research team to evaluate screening tests and evaluate their predictive value for athletic injury when used as a pre-assessment tool.

Baptist Sports Medicine clinics can be found throughout Middle Tennessee, with locations in downtown Nashville, Antioch, Bellevue, Brentwood, Centerville, Green Hills, Murfreesboro, Pleasant View, Rivergate and Spring Hill, as well as at Lipscomb University.

Sponsorships
Baptist Sports Medicine is the exclusive provider of medical services to the Tennessee Titans, Tennessee Secondary School Athletic Association and Lipscomb University. Until June 2008, it was also a sponsor of the Nashville Predators.

References

External links
Baptist Sports Medicine

Healthcare in Tennessee